Cornelius Smith may refer to:

 Cornelius A. Smith (born 1937), Bahamian politician and diplomat, eleventh governor-general of the Bahamas
 Cornelius C. Smith (1869–1936), American officer in the U.S. Army
 Cornelius Cole Smith Jr. (1913–2004), American author and military historian
 Cornelius Smith Jr. (born 1982), American actor